Ultimate Pinball Quest (also known as The Ultimate Pinball Quest) is a pinball video game for the Amiga that was released as Living Ball for DOS. It was developed by Interactivision and released by Infogrames in Europe and BitWise Computer Software in the United States in 1994.

Gameplay
The game can be played in either normal Arcade or story-driven Adventure modes, and in Bonus mode for the minigame tables.

Plot
In the game's Adventure mode, six elements ensuring the temporal and ecological balance of the planet Calypso have been stolen by three power-hungry magical princesses. A warrior needs to challenge and defeat each of the witches (Wuhan, Omdura and Freila) in their respective domains (the desert, the arctic, and metal wasteland themed tables) in order to find and retrieve the elements and restore the planet.

Reception
The game's Amiga version has received generally mediocre or negative reviews.

See also
Dragon's Revenge

References

External links
Living Ball at MobyGames
Ultimate Pinball Quest at Hall of Light Amiga

1994 video games
Amiga games
DOS games
Fantasy video games
Pinball video games
Single-player video games
Video games developed in Denmark
Video games about witchcraft